Lee Dong-keun (born September 10, 1979) is a South Korean curler from Gyeongbuk. He is a former Pacific Curling champion, and has twice skipped Korea at the World Curling Championships.

Career
Lee has played in five Pacific Curling Championships. At the 2003 World University Games, Lee's Korean rink picked up a bronze medal. At the 2003 Ford World Men's Curling Championship, Korea finished in last place. The following season he won a bronze medal at the Pacific curling championships.

Lee did not play internationally for five years, before finishing 4th at the 2008 Pacific Curling Championships. Two years later he won a silver medal at the 2010 Pacific Curling Championships, losing to China's Wang Fengchun in the final.

Personal life
Lee was once a bowler, but made the transition to curling in 1998 upon the recommendation of a friend.

External links
 
Korean bowler turned curler to represent his country at world men's curling championship - Regina Leader-Post

1979 births
Living people
South Korean male curlers
Asian Games medalists in curling
Curlers at the 2003 Asian Winter Games
Medalists at the 2003 Asian Winter Games
Asian Games gold medalists for South Korea
Universiade medalists in curling
Universiade bronze medalists for South Korea
Medalists at the 2003 Winter Universiade
21st-century South Korean people